The discography of Shizuka, a rock band from Tokyo, Japan, consists of one studio album, three live albums, two live video albums , and four compact cassettes. Shizuka's discography also includes appearances in six compilation albums of various artists, and miscellaneous appearances in at least three video footages.

Albums

Studio albums

Live albums

Video albums

Compact cassettes

Miscellaneous appearances

Compilations

Videos

See also 
 Shizuka Miura

References

External links 

 Shizuka (band) at Myspace

Discographies of Japanese artists